Jeanne II may refer to:

 Jeanne II of Burgundy (1292–1330)
 Jeanne II of Navarre (1312–1349)
 Jeanne II d'Auvergne (1378 – c. 1424)
 Jeanne II d'Anglure (14?? – 1505)